Apostate capiendo (Latin for "taking an apostate") was an old English writ against an individual. It prescribed the arrest of a person, who having entered and professed some religious order (such as a monk), broke from his cloister, contrary to the rules of his order.

See also

 Advocatione decimarum
 Apostasy
 Chartis reddendis

References
F Donald Logan. Runaway Religious in Medieval England, C.1240-1540. Cambridge University Press. 1996. Pages 24, 26, 97, 98, 100 to 103, 105 to 107, 111, 114, 116, 117, 120, 130, 178, 179, 180.
Elizabeth Makowski. Canon Law and Cloistered Women. Catholic University of America Press. 1997. Pages 120 and 121.
Eileen Power. Medieval English Nunneries, C. 1275 to 1535. Biblo and Tannen. 1988. Pages 443 and 462.
R H Helmholz. The Spirit of Classical Canon Law. University of Georgia Press. 2010. Page 234.
"Book Reviews" (1997) 38 Heythrop Journal 214

Apostasy
Ecclesiastical writs
Legal documents with Latin names
Legal history of England